Halia is an Austronesian language of Buka Island and the Selau Peninsula of Bougainville Island, Papua New Guinea.

Phonology
The phonology of the Halia language:

Consonants

Vowels 

Diphthong vowel sounds include .

 exists, but not as a monophthong.

Allophones

Literature
In the 1960s Francis Hagai produced a series of liturgies in Halia as part of his work with the Hahalis Welfare Society.

References

External links 
 Written materials on Halia are available at Kaipuleohone under 'Selau'

Northwest Solomonic languages
Languages of Papua New Guinea
Languages of the Autonomous Region of Bougainville